La loba herida (The Wounded She-Wolf) is a Venezuelan telenovela shown in 1992, starring with Mariela Alcala, Carlos Montilla, and Astrid Carolina Herrera. This telenovela contains 214 episodes. Nicandro Díaz produced its remake, known as Contra Viento y Marea for Televisa in 2005.

Synopsis 
Rosana Soler is a young Spanish girl who is sent to Venezuela to live with her Aunt Celeste and Uncle Elias when she is orphaned. After a rape attempt by her uncle, Rosana runs away from home and meets Eva Rudel, a cruel woman who runs a whorehouse. Thanks to Celeste, Rosana becomes a ward of Eva, whose husband has a bastard son, Alvaro, that he wants to legitimize and bring to Caracas. Armando doesn't know that his son had been a bullfighter who was killed in the ring, so when he shows up in Spain to collect his son, Alvaro's sister Isabel dresses up as a boy and greets her new dad. Isabel's goal, however, is to wreak vengeance on Eva, who was responsible for landing her mother in jail. Rosana accompanies Armando to Spain and on the plane bumps into Makuto, who has just been released from prison where he was incarcerated for a crime he didn't commit. They fall in love.

Cast 
 Mariela Alcala as Rosana Soler
 Carlos Montilla as Macuto
 Jorge Aravena  as Cabrerita
 Astrid Carolina Herrera as Isabel/Alvaro/Lucero
 Julie Restifo as Eva Rudell
 Elba Escobar as La Franca
 Luis Fernández as Daniel
 Javier Vidal as Martin Guzman
 Astrid Gruber as Ambar Castillo
 Ines María Calero as Muñeca
 Alberto Sunshine as Gustavo
 Gladys Caceres as Erika
 Betty Ruth as Doña Rocio
 Martin Lantigua as Armando Castillo
 Alma Inglann as Carmela
 Olimpia Maldonado as Julieta
 Juan C. Gardie as Antonio
 Yajaira Paredes as Gloria
 Carolina Groppuso as Grilla
 Alexander Montilla as Guillermo
 Johnny Nessy as Saúl
 Gabriela Spanic
 Jose Antonio Carbonell

External links
La loba herida at the Internet Movie Database

1992 telenovelas
Venezuelan telenovelas
1992 Venezuelan television series debuts
1992 Venezuelan television series endings
Spanish-language telenovelas
Television shows set in Venezuela